Pyncostola illuminata is a moth of the family Gelechiidae. It was described by Edward Meyrick in 1913. It is found in South Africa, where it has been recorded from Mpumalanga, KwaZulu-Natal, Gauteng and Limpopo.

The wingspan is 18–21 mm. The forewings are light brownish ochreous, all veins marked with pale greyish-ochreous streaks irrorated (sprinkled) with dark fuscous. There are dark fuscous dots between these streaks beneath the costa at one-fifth and one-third, one on the fold between these, and three representing the stigmata, the plical very obliquely before the first discal. The hindwings are pale ochreous grey.

References

Endemic moths of South Africa
Moths described in 1913
Pyncostola